Səncərədi (also, Senceredi, Sandzharadi, Sandzharady, and Sanjaradi) is a village and municipality in the Astara Rayon of Azerbaijan.  It has a population of 1,849.  The municipality consists of the villages of Səncərədi and Şuvaş.

References 

Populated places in Astara District